"Call If You Need Me" is a song by Australian singer-songwriter Vance Joy. The song was released on 11 February 2018 by Liberation Music as the fifth single from his second studio album, Nation of Two (2018). The song charted on the Billboard Hot Rock & Alternative Songs along with three other songs from the album and peaked at number 30.

Music video
The video was directed by Mimi Cave and released on 12 February 2018.

Track listing

Charts

Certifications

References
 

2018 singles
Vance Joy songs
Songs written by Vance Joy